Brandon United Football Club is a football club based in Brandon, County Durham, England.

History
The club was established in 1968 as the works team of a waste paper company, and were initially shared the name of the company Rostrons. They joined Division Three of the Durham & District Sunday League, winning the division in their first season. They went on to win Division Two the following season, and were promoted to Division One. The mid-1970s saw Brandon win Division One four times in successive seasons between 1973–74 and 1976–77. They also won the Durham Sunday Cup in 1973–74, 1975–76 and 1976–77, as well as the FA Sunday Cup in 1975–76.

In 1977 the club joined the Northern Alliance, winning back-to-back championships in their first two seasons in the league, also winning the League Cup in their first season. Although they only finished fourth in 1979–80, the club entered the FA Cup for the first time, and reached the first round. Drawn at home to Bradford City, the match was moved to Spennymoor United's ground, with Bradford winning 3–0. The season also saw them win the League Cup for a second time.

In the summer of 1980 Brandon left the Northern Alliance to join the Northern Amateur League, but after a single season, they were elected to the Wearside League. Two seasons later, they moved up to Division Two of the Northern League. After finishing fourth in 1983–84, they won the division the following season, and were promoted to the Premier Division. In 1988–89 they reached the first round of the FA Cup again; after drawing 0–0 at Doncaster Rovers, the replay was also played at Doncaster's Belle Vue, with Rovers winning 2–1.

Brandon were relegated to Division Two at the end of the 1993–94 season, but returned to Division One after winning Division Two in 1999–2000. The club were Division One champions in 2002–03, but finished bottom of Division One in 2005–06 and were relegated back to Division Two.

Honours
Northern League
Division One champions 2002–03
Division Two champions 1984–85, 1999–2000
Northern Alliance
Champions 1977–78, 1978–79
League Cup winners 1977–78, 1979–80
Sunderland Shipowners Cup
Winners 1981–82
FA Sunday Cup
Winners 1975–76
Durham & District Sunday League
Division One champions 1973–74, 1974–75, 1975–76, 1976–77
Division Two champions 1969–70
Division Three champions 1968–69
Durham Sunday Cup
Winners 1973–74, 1975–76, 1976–77

Records
Best FA Cup performance: First round, 1979–80, 1988–89
Best FA Trophy performance: Third qualifying round, 1987–88, 1989–90
Best FA Vase performance: Quarter-finals, 1982–83, 1983–84
Record attendance: 2,500, FA Sunday Cup semi-final
Most appearances: Derek Charlton (1977–1986)
Most goals: Tommy Holden

See also
Brandon United F.C. players

References

External links

Football clubs in England
Football clubs in County Durham
Association football clubs established in 1968
1968 establishments in England
Northern Football Alliance
Wearside Football League
Northern Football League
Works association football teams in England